Burk may refer to:

Places
 Burk, Bavaria, a municipality in the district of Ansbach, Bavaria, Germany
 Burk, a city district of Bautzen_(district), Saxony, Germany
 Burk, a neighborhood of Forchheim (Oberfranken), Bavaria, Germany

People
 Burk (name), given name and surname

Other uses
 Burk House (disambiguation)

See also
Burking, a particular form of smothering
 Burks (disambiguation)
 Burke (disambiguation)
 Burck
 Berk (disambiguation)
 de Burgh, a surname
 Birk (disambiguation)
 Bourke (disambiguation)
 Berg (disambiguation)
 Burgos, a city of northern Spain
 Burgh,  an autonomous corporate entity in Scotland